Sean Parrish (born 14 March 1972) is a Welsh footballer who played as a midfielder. He is currently the assistant coach of Wolverhampton Wanderers U23.

Parrish began his career at Shrewsbury Town but played only a handful of games before joining non-league club Telford United. He moved to Doncaster Rovers in 1994 before joining Northampton Town two years later where he enjoyed some of his most notable success, scoring a superb goal at Cardiff in the play-off semifinal from outside the box then winning promotion in the final at Wembley in 1997. Sean was also instrumental in Northampton reaching the Division Two play-off final the following season.

He then joined Chesterfield in 2000 and was a key player in winning promotion. A move to Kidderminster Harriers followed in 2002, before joining AFC Telford United in 2004.

Honours
Northampton Town
Football League Third Division play-offs: 1997

References

1972 births
Living people
Welsh footballers
Association football midfielders
Shrewsbury Town F.C. players
Telford United F.C. players
Doncaster Rovers F.C. players
Northampton Town F.C. players
Chesterfield F.C. players
Kidderminster Harriers F.C. players
AFC Telford United players
English Football League players
National League (English football) players
Welsh football managers
AFC Telford United managers
Wolverhampton Wanderers F.C. non-playing staff